Blomia may refer to:
 Blomia (mite), a genus of mites in the family Echimyopodidae
 Blomia (plant), a genus of flowering plants in the family Sapindaceae